The Evangelical Methodist Church in Uruguay is a member of the World Methodist Council. It has 1,000 members and 12 congregations. It is also an autonomous affiliate of the United Methodist Church.

History 
The church was founded by British missionaries in the mid-1800s. In 1893 it became a district, when the Latin America Conference was formed. In 1952 the Uruguay provisional Conference was formed; in 1968 it became autonomous.

Social issues 
Women are able to be ordained in the denomination, and from 1994 to 2000 the president of the church was a lay woman, Beatriz Ferrari. The church has also "resolved that pastors that wish to minister to homosexuals could do so freely". As a result, some congregations and ministers have provided blessing services for same-gender couples.

References 

Methodism in Uruguay